Weldon Ashe (1826-1874) was an Anglican priest in Ireland during the 19th-century.

Ashe was  educated at Trinity College, Dublin. He was the incumbent at Ballina, County Mayo; and Archdeacon of Killala from 1871 until his death.

Notes

Alumni of Trinity College Dublin
Deans of Tuam
Church of Ireland priests
19th-century Irish Anglican priests
Clergy from County Limerick
1826 births
1874 deaths
Archdeacons of Killala